Eri Sudewo (born 12 May 1919, date of death unknown) was an Indonesian sailor. He competed in the Dragon event at the 1960 Summer Olympics.

References

External links
 

1919 births
Year of death missing
Indonesian male sailors (sport)
Olympic sailors of Indonesia
Sailors at the 1960 Summer Olympics – Dragon
People from Pasuruan
20th-century Indonesian people